The leading football clubs in Montserrat play in the Montserrat Championship league.

List of clubs
Bata Falcons
FC Elberton
Ideal SC
Jolly Rodger
Little Bay FC
Montserrat Secondary School
Montserrat Volcano Observatory Tremors
P.C. United FC
Royal Montserrat Police Force FC
FC Saint John's
Salem FC
Seven Day Adventists Trendsetters

Montserrat
 
Football clubs
Football clubs